Gerodimos Stathas (1712–1800) was a Greek armatolos during the pre-Greek Revolution era in Greece. His given name was Dimosthenis, shortened to Dimos, but due to his age and as a title of respect, he was given the prefix Geros ("old man"). He was the founder of the family of the Stathaioi of the Valtos Region. His son Giannis Stathas went on to lead major revolts against the Ottoman Empire. He is also considered to be the grandfather of Georgios Karaiskakis.

In 1766 Gerodimos took up arms against the Ottoman Empire following a promise of Georgios Papazolis that the Russian Empire would provide help to a Greek revolution. The Orlov Revolt finally ended in 1774 with the total defeat of the Greek rebels. The Russians had signed a peace treaty effectively ending the Russo-Turkish War and leaving the Greeks without any support. Gerodimos successfully defended against the Turkish reprisals that followed.

1712 births
1800 deaths
Greeks from the Ottoman Empire
Greek revolutionaries
18th-century Greek people
People from Inachos, Aetolia-Acarnania